Cyro de Freitas Valle (16 August 18967 November 1969) was a Brazilian lawyer and diplomat. He was acting Minister of Foreign Affairs in the governments of Getúlio Vargas, from January to March 1939, and Eurico Gaspar Dutra, from May to June 1949.

He was the second President of the United Nations Security Council, serving from 17 February 1946 to 16 March 1946. During World War II, Freitas Valle was a minister in Berlin and actively worked against Jewish immigration to Brazil.

References

1896 births
1969 deaths
20th-century Brazilian lawyers
Brazilian diplomats
Ambassadors of Brazil to Germany
Vargas Era
Permanent Representatives of Brazil to the United Nations